Jalal Alireza oglu Aliyev (June 30, 1928 – January 31, 2016) was a Soviet and Azerbaijani scientist-breeder, statesman; academician, member of the Presidium of the Azerbaijan National Academy of Sciences and deputy of Milli Majlis of the Azerbaijan Republic. Born in Nakhchivan, he was the brother of the late President of Azerbaijan, Heydar Aliyev, and the uncle of the present President of Azerbaijan, Ilham Aliyev. He died in Baku in 2016.

References

External links
 ДЖАЛАЛ АЛИРЗА ОГЛЫ АЛИЕВ

1928 births
2016 deaths
Foreign Members of the Russian Academy of Sciences
Members of the National Assembly (Azerbaijan)
Recipients of the Istiglal Order
Recipients of the Order of the Red Banner of Labour
Aliyev family